The Eclipse 550 is a very light jet initially built by Eclipse Aerospace and later One Aviation of Albuquerque, New Mexico, United States. The aircraft is a development version of the Eclipse 500, which was produced by predecessor Eclipse Aviation. Like the 500, the 550 is a low-wing, six seat, twin engine jet-powered aircraft. The Eclipse 550 is certified for single-pilot operation.

The aircraft was announced at the National Business Aviation Association convention in Las Vegas, Nevada in October 2011. The first example was rolled out in March 2013 and the first customer delivery was on 22 October 2013.

In March 2017 the company announced that 550 production would end after four more aircraft were completed, to concentrate production on the new Eclipse 700 model of the aircraft.

In February 2021, One Aviation entered a Chapter 7 bankruptcy liquidation process.

Development

The 550 was developed from the earlier Eclipse 500, enabled by Sikorsky Aircraft's investment in Eclipse Aerospace in 2010. It retains the 500's airframe and PW610F engines, but incorporates an improved avionics package, including satellite phones, autothrottles, synthetic vision and enhanced vision systems, as well as anti-skid brakes.

In May 2012 the company signed a deal with Sikorsky subsidiary PZL Mielec to have the Polish company build the Eclipse 550 fuselage, empennage and wings, while final aircraft assembly will be carried out by Eclipse Aerospace at their Albuquerque, New Mexico plant.

The initial price for the 550 in 2011 was US$2.695M and production was intended at that time to be 50–100 aircraft per year. The aircraft achieved an FAA production certificate in April 2012.

In June 2013 the FAA approved the Eclipse 550 for a fatigue limit of 20,000 hours or 20,000 cycles with an unlimited calendar life. In August 2013 it was announced that the aircraft would incorporate autothrottles, new EFIS software, an anti-lock braking system and a high-resolution 3.25" x 4.3" standby display.

In February 2014 the FAA approved autothrottles and anti-skid brakes for the 550.

The first customer delivery of a 550 was completed on 12 March 2014, and 10 had been delivered by August. However, sales had been slow, and employees were laid off.

One Aviation received EASA certification for its Eclipse 550 on 18 November 2015, clearing the way for sales of the light twinjet in the European Union and its use for air-taxi service there. The company has deposits from half a dozen European customers awaiting delivery pending certification. Deliveries will begin in January 2016, according to Cary Winter, One Aviation's executive vice president. The only changes required from U.S. production models are to “paint a couple of switches red and change the connector on the door switch,” he said.

In March 2017 the company announced that 550 production would end in favour of production of the new "Canada" model of the aircraft.

Eclipse 700 

One Aviation is designing an improved $3.495 million "Project Canada" variant that was planned to have its first flight in 2017. It will have similar takeoff, approach and landing speeds but will need 24% less runway at takeoff at sea level and ISA+25 and time to climb to FL400 at ISA+10 will be halved. Garmin G3000 avionics suite includes synthetic vision, GFC 700 autopilot, Garmin ESP protection system, LNAV and VNAV, and is ADS-B and RVSM compliant.

This selection follows the possible end of the PW615 production as a backlog of already developed PW610s components for the Eclipse 500 is consumed, and restarting the production line at a low rate and for a short time is uncertain.
The production of the 550 could be interrupted as early as in 2017, leaving a gap until "Project Canada" reaches market, which was initially forecast for late 2018 or early 2019, but which was not met.

It is intended that "Project Canada" will be eventually designated as the Eclipse EA700, but it requires an additional investment of US$50 million to complete the development. It will compete with similar light business jets like the HondaJet and the Embraer Phenom 100 and also with high-speed single turboprops such as the Daher TBM 930/910.

In 2017 it was forecast that the aircraft would be priced at $3.6 million and by July 2017 had received 30 orders, mostly from current owners, who will benefit from a trade-in program.
Certification was expected between January and July 2019, provided that One Aviation secured sufficient investment.

Three prototypes are planned: the first, presented in August 2017 and developed from an Eclipse 500, sports an aerodynamically conforming wing and the next, also based on an existing plane, will test the FJ33. The EA700 wing was first flown on an existing fuselage in September 2017.

On October 10, 2018, One Aviation announced it had voluntarily filed for Chapter 11 bankruptcy.
Citiking International, a Chinese-supported company, then acquired the company; and the acquisition was cleared on March 9, 2020. However, in February 2021, it was reported that those efforts were ultimately unsuccessful and that the company's Chapter 11 reorganization case had been converted to a Chapter 7 bankruptcy liquidation process, with United States-based company AML Global Eclipse LLC maintaining support for all current Eclipse aircraft under the name Eclipse Aerospace, Inc.

Operational history
In 2013, Eclipse planned to submit the 550 for the USAF's very light jet requirement, even though that requirement specified FAR Part 25 certification and the 550 is certified to the less-stringent Part 23.

Specifications (550)

See also

References

External links

One Aviation aircraft
550
Very light jets
Twinjets
T-tail aircraft
Aircraft first flown in 2013